SDF may refer to:

Computing

File formats
 Simple Data Format, for binary data
 Spatial Data File, for geodatabases
 Standard Delay Format, for timing data
 SQL Server Compact Edition Database File (filename extension: .sdf)
 Structure data file, for chemical tables
 Scientific Data Format, a Hierarchical Data Format implementation

Formal computer science
 Signed distance function (or field), in mathematical applications
 Syntax Definition Formalism, to describe formal languages

Other uses in computing
 Software development folder, a physical or virtual container for software project artifacts
 Synchronous Data Flow, a restriction of Kahn process networks
 SDF Public Access Unix System, a shared shell provider

Entertainment and media
 Südtirol Digital Fernsehen, a TV station in South Tyrol, Italy
 Super Dimensional Fortress, warships in the Robotech/Macross franchise

Organizations

Military forces
 Japan Self-Defense Forces
 State defense force, US 
 Sudan Defence Force, 1925–1955
 Syrian Democratic Forces, North and East Syria

Political parties
 Sikkim Democratic Front, India
 Social Democratic Federation (United States), 1936–1956
 Social Democratic Federation, UK, 1884–1911
 Social Democratic Forum, Hong Kong, 2000
 Social Democratic Front (disambiguation), Cameroon and Ghana
 Socialist Democratic Federation (Japan), 1978–1994

Other organizations
 Scouts de France, youth group
 Serb Democratic Forum, Serbs of Croatia

Places
 Louisville International Airport, Kentucky, US (by IATA code)
 Soquel Demonstration State Forest, California, US

Science
 Silver diammine fluoride, in dentistry
 Stromal cell-derived factor (disambiguation), SDF1, SDF1a, etc.
 Subwavelength-diameter optical fibre
 Synchronous diaphragmatic flutter or hiccup

Other uses
 SDF Group (SAME Deutz-Fahr), an Italian-based agricultural machine manufacturer
 Simplified directional facility, an aviation instrument approach navigational aid
 Stochastic discount factor, in econometrics